Ángel Romero (1 October 1932 – 21 September 2007) was a Mexican cyclist and politician. He competed in the individual and team road race events at the 1952 Summer Olympics. He was also twice municipal president of Zapopan, 1961–1963 and 1974–1976.

References

External links
 

1932 births
2007 deaths
Mexican male cyclists
Olympic cyclists of Mexico
Cyclists at the 1952 Summer Olympics
20th-century Mexican politicians
Municipal presidents in Jalisco